Best of Bone Brothers is a greatest hits album released in 2010 by Real Talk Entertainment. It features Bone Brothers most popular songs.

Track listing

References

 

2010 greatest hits albums
Bone Brothers albums
Albums produced by Big Hollis